The Trinity Memorial Methodist Episcopal Church, also known as Trinity Methodist Church, was a historic Methodist Episcopal church at 420 Ben Street in Clarksburg, Harrison County, West Virginia. It was built in 1902, and was a modest late-Victorian Gothic-Romanesque style brick structure.  It was a two-story rectangular building with a slate covered gable roof.  It featured a three-story, square bell tower with an open belfry.

It was listed on the National Register of Historic Places in 1984.  Since that time, it has been demolished.

References

Churches on the National Register of Historic Places in West Virginia
Methodist churches in West Virginia
Churches completed in 1902
Buildings and structures in Clarksburg, West Virginia
National Register of Historic Places in Harrison County, West Virginia
Demolished churches in the United States
Gothic Revival church buildings in West Virginia
Romanesque Revival church buildings in West Virginia
Victorian architecture in West Virginia
Demolished buildings and structures in West Virginia
Former churches in West Virginia
Methodist Episcopal churches in the United States